Rushville is a former unincorporated community in Kellogg Township, Jasper County, Iowa, United States.

History
Rushville was platted in 1857 and it had its beginnings as a stage coach shop.  The only store to ever exist in the town was operated by the Whitcomb family and contained the post office.  Rushville had a church, several homes, and later a school.

Eventually, the railroad was constructed and bypassed Rushville to the south by two miles.  This gradually led to the decline of the town. Rushville's population in 1915 was 1. 

In 1957, the school was consolidated into nearby Kellogg and the building was later demolished. 

There are no longer any buildings in Rushville.  Only a few nearby farms exist.  A memorial plot containing a plaque, flag, and water pump remains within the city limits. Nearby Rushville Cemetery continues to be maintained.

References

Unincorporated communities in Jasper County, Iowa
Populated places established in 1857
Unincorporated communities in Iowa
1857 establishments in Iowa